S. pratensis may refer to:
 Salvia pratensis, a perennial sage species
 Succisa pratensis, a flowering plant species